The New Jersey State League of Municipalities is a voluntary association created by a New Jersey statute in 1915 to serve municipalities and local officials in the U.S. state of New Jersey. All 565 of New Jersey's municipalities are members of the League and all elected and appointed officials of member municipalities are entitled to the League's services. The organization is headquartered in the state capital of Trenton.

The league's Annual Conference, held each November in Atlantic City allows delegates the opportunity to participate in more than 100 panels, clinics, workshops, and other sessions. The 2004 Conference was attended by over 21,000 individuals, making it the largest municipal gathering in the country.

The organization awards 10 years and 20 year service awards to New Jersey mayors as part of their Mayors Hall of Fame.

See also
List of municipalities in New Jersey
List of micro-regional organizations

References

External links
New Jersey State League of Municipalities

Councils of governments
League of Municipalities
Organizations based in New Jersey
Local government organizations
1915 establishments in New Jersey